Leona Heights is a neighborhood of Oakland in Alameda County, California. It lies at an elevation of 325 feet (99 m).

References

Neighborhoods in Oakland, California